Yan Wenliang (20 July 1893 – 1 May 1988) was a Chinese painter and educator, who is regarded as one of the fathers of Chinese oil painting and an important art educator of his time. Born in Suzhou, Jiangsu province, Yan began studying painting in 1909, founded the Suzhou Art Academy along with Zhu Shijie in 1922 and went to Paris in 1929, enrolling in the L'Ecole Superieure Nationale des Beaux Arts, making him, along with Xu Beihong and Sanyu, one of the earliest Chinese artists to study abroad in France. He was one of the four pioneers of Chinese modern art who earned the title of "The Four Great Academy Presidents".

Career

Early life 

Yan Wenliang founded the Suzhou Art Academy with his friend Zhu Shijie in 1922. Yan studied painting in Paris between 1929 and 1931, alongside other Chinese painters such as Fang Ganmin, his travels coinciding with those of Liu Haisu, and painted in the Impressionist style. While in Europe, Yan assembled a collection of plaster casts of famous European sculptures, which totalled as many as 500 pieces, which he shipped home to be used at the Academy.

Post-1949 China 
In 1952, as part of a national reorganization of art schools by the Chinese Communist Party, both Shanghai Art Academy and Suzhou Art Academy were moved out of Shanghai and formed the East China Arts Academy in Wuxi.

Yan Wenliang was transferred to the post of vice-director of the East China campus of CAFA, a job that Yan initially refused. Yan was ultimately persuaded by Boshan, a professor of the East China Cultural Department, appealing to Yan's ideals as an educator. Yan accepted the Hangzhou position to teach the ideologically unproblematic subjects of perspective and color theory. In 1957, Yan published a book on colour theory.

In the lively art scene of Shanghai, many painters worked in the Post-Impressionist and Fauvist styles taught before 1949 at the Suzhou Art Academy and the Shanghai Art Academy. The unofficial Shanghai art scene was dominated by the styles of Yan Wenliang and Liu Haisu, which trend persisted even during the later years of the Cultural Revolution.

Cultural Revolution 
One surprising result of Yan's influence was the development of an underground landscape painting movement in Shanghai during the early 1970s, at the height of the Cultural Revolution's promotion of pro-government and Realist figure painting. After being tried by the Red Guards for some time, Yan Wenliang was liberated from the investigatory incarceration of the Cultural Revolution authorities in 1969 and spent time painting by himself for the rest of his years.

Late life and legacy 
Yan Wenliang attracted many young followers when it was discovered that he painted in the park and that he sometimes gave technical pointers to young artists who worked nearby. He welcomed the enthusiastic young artists to his apartment, where he showed them the paintings that he had painted in France and Italy 45 years before. The result of his kindness was that Romantic and Impressionist styles of early 20th century France became integrated into a new regional Shanghai style. It was also practiced and inherited by his students from the Suzhou Art Academy, and many self-taught artists of the 'lost generation', those born in the 1950s who had been denied formal schooling by the Cultural Revolution.

Yan Wenliang died in 1988 at the age of 94.

Among the pioneers of Chinese modern art, four men earned the title of "The Four Great Academy Presidents": Lin Fengmian, Xu Beihong, Liu Haisu, and Yan Wenliang. These artists were revered in the early Republican Era due to their effective stewardship of the Hangzhou National School of Fine Art, the Art Department of Central University, the Shanghai Academy of Arts, and the Soochow College of Art respectively. Of the four Presidents, Yan Wenliang's surviving works are the fewest, and those with clear provenance are even rarer.

Works 

Yan Wenliang's oil paintings of landscapes are an extension and expansion of Chinese traditional landscape painting. His lifelong study of perspective and colour were an important chapter in the modernization and internationalization of Chinese art.

Kitchen (厨房) (1920) is one of Yan's best-known works. A panoramic depiction of an old-fashioned Jiangnan kitchen scene, its lifelike imagery and balanced colors reflect the artist's grasp of perspective, light and shade.

The fifteen years between 1950 and 1965 were Yan Wenliang's most prolific period in terms of artwork and experimentation. A stable academic environment allowed him ample time to paint. It was during this period that Yan's style became fully honed. Important works of during period include Dawn of the Pujiang River (浦江夜航) (1953) and The Countryside Late at Night ((深夜之市郊) 1954). 

Another notable work is Southern Lake (南湖) (1964), which depicts the "red boat on the Southern Lake", the allegorical birthplace of the Chinese Communist Party. It is currently in the collection of the National Art Museum of China in Beijing. 

Yan's later period began with his return to Shanghai in 1969, when he produced works such as Ode of Our Country (1982).

Legacy 
Serving as the first president of Suzhou Art School, Yan became on par in fame with Xu Beihong (president of Beijing's National Art School), Liu Haisu (president the Shanghai Academy of Fine Arts), and Ling Feng-mien (president of the National Hangzhou School of Arts). These artists had been labelled by painter Peng Xunqin as the Republic of China's four greatest in their position, and all four were spearheads of the national modern art movement of the time.

The other three masters became active in the areas of oil and Chinese ink painting. Yan Wenliang's whole career, in contrast, was spent on exploring the depths of oil painting, which led him to discovering a unique style and philosophy of painting on his own, and allowed him to combine in his creative processes the Western language of oil painting with Eastern values and aesthetics.

Art critic Shang Hui once said, 'Yan Wenliang was one of the very few Chinese artists to have a truly firm comprehension of impressionism while at the same time being a Courbet-influenced Europe-taught realist oil painter. In his artistic language, he was closer to Chinese aesthetics, but when compared with the other pioneers of modern Chinese art, Yan's style sported a great number of differences among many similarities.'

See also 
Zhu Shijie
 Western painting

Notes 

1893 births
1988 deaths
Republic of China painters
Academic staff of the École des Beaux-Arts
Academic staff of China Academy of Art
Victims of the Cultural Revolution
Painters from Suzhou
20th-century Chinese painters
Educators from Suzhou
Chinese art educators